RACC is an acronym and may refer to:

Royal Albert Cycling Club, originating in 1887
Richmond Adult Community College, Richmond, Surrey, UK
Reading Area Community College,  Reading, Pennsylvania, United States
Regional Arts & Culture Council, Portland, Oregon, United States
Reference Amounts Customarily Consumed, Nutritional content
Royal Automobile Club of Catalonia, a motoring club in Catalunya, Spain.